Riverside Theater may refer to:

 Riverside Theater (Jacksonville), a former cinema, now the Five Points Theater
 Riverside Theater (Milwaukee)

See also 
 Riverside Theatre (disambiguation)